The 2004 WTA Tour was the elite professional tennis circuit organized by the Women's Tennis Association (WTA) for the 2004 season. The 2004 WTA Tour calendar comprised the Grand Slam tournaments (supervised by the International Tennis Federation (ITF)), the WTA Tier I-V Events, the Fed Cup (organized by the ITF), the Summer Olympic Games and the year-end championships.

In an open year, Lindsay Davenport finished the season at No. 1 for the third time after 1998 and 2001, despite not reaching a Grand Slam final. Amélie Mauresmo put together a consistent season, reaching No. 1 in September and finishing the year ranked No. 2. The Russian contingent enjoyed an impressive rise into the elite of women's tennis, with Anastasia Myskina, Maria Sharapova and Svetlana Kuznetsova all winning their first Grand Slam titles, and Elena Dementieva twice being a runner-up. The Belgian pair of Kim Clijsters and Justine Henin-Hardenne, who had risen to the top of women's tennis during 2003, both struggled with injuries throughout the season. Likewise, the dominance of the Williams sisters diminished, with both finishing the season outside the top 5.

Season summary

Singles
World No. 1 Justine Henin-Hardenne started the season on a high note, taking the title in Sydney and then winning her third Grand Slam title at the Australian Open, defeating Kim Clijsters in the final. Fabiola Zuluaga and Patty Schnyder enjoyed runs to their first ever Grand Slam semifinals in singles. Schnyder took advantage of an open draw which saw Venus Williams dumped out in the third round by Lisa Raymond. Zuluaga advanced after Elena Dementieva and Nadia Petrova were early upset victims in her section of the draw, and then benefitted from a walkover from Amélie Mauresmo in the quarterfinals. Defending champion Serena Williams withdrew from the tournament due to her continuing recovery from knee surgery.

Henin-Hardenne won in Dubai amidst a 16-match win streak, which was snapped by Svetlana Kuznetsova in Doha. Kuznetsova lost to the defending champion Anastasia Myskina in the final. Elsewhere, Lindsay Davenport won her fourth title in Tokyo, tying Martina Hingis for the most wins at the event. Clijsters won the indoor tournaments in Paris and Antwerp, but struggled with injury for the rest of the season. Henin-Hardenne moved straight back to winning ways by taking the title in Indian Wells. Serena Williams would return in March, winning her first tournament back in Miami.

The clay court season began with Davenport claiming the title in Amelia Island. Venus Williams then won both Charleston and Warsaw in succession. Amelie Mauresmo won the two biggest warm-up tournaments on red clay at Berlin and Rome, with Williams also reaching the final in Germany. Mauresmo's feat of winning both events was previously matched by Steffi Graf and Monica Seles, both of whom also lifted the French Open that same year.

However, it proved not to be a good omen for Mauresmo as she lost to Elena Dementieva in the quarterfinals. Clijsters withdrew from the tournament with a wrist injury, whilst her compatriot and defending champion Henin-Hardenne bowed out in the second round with injury against Tathiana Garbin. It was the earliest loss for the No. 1 seed there since 1925. That upset allowed Paola Suárez to reach her first Grand Slam semifinal in singles, where she lost to Dementieva. In the bottom half of the draw, Anastasia Myskina came through after wins over Venus Williams and Jennifer Capriati. The first all-Russian Grand Slam final ended quickly, with Myskina routing a nervous Dementieva to become the first Grand Slam singles champion from Russia.

Russian dominance continued in the grass court warmups, with Maria Sharapova winning in Birmingham and Svetlana Kuznetsova prevailing in Eastbourne. Mary Pierce also claimed her first tour title since the French Open four years previously, winning in 's-Hertogenbosch. Clijsters and Henin-Hardenne sat out the year's third Grand Slam with the same injuries that put them out of the French Open. The first week of Wimbledon saw Venus Williams sent home in the second round by Karolina Šprem, whilst the two French Open finalists failed to make the successful transition between clay and grass: Dementieva lost to Sandra Kleinová, and Myskina to Amy Frazier. The final was to be contested between Serena Williams and Maria Sharapova, who both made impressive comebacks in their semifinals from a set and a break down. In the final, Sharapova upset the two-time defending champion to win her first Grand Slam title, the third youngest winner ever at Wimbledon.

Davenport started the summer hardcourt season on a hot streak, winning events in Stanford, Los Angeles, San Diego and Cincinnati to build an impressive winning run going into the year's final Grand Slam. Nicole Vaidišová became one of the youngest tour titlists in history by winning a smaller event in Vancouver. Mauresmo won the Tier I event in Toronto, beating Elena Likhovtseva in the final. Henin-Hardenne returned from her illness to play the Athens Olympics, where she won the gold medal match over Mauresmo. In the bronze medal match, Alicia Molik beat Myskina.

Davenport was the favourite to take her second U.S. Open title, but she was stopped in the semifinals by Svetlana Kuznetsova. It was a half of upsets with Henin-Hardenne falling to Nadia Petrova, and Myskina and Sharapova also departing early. Henin-Hardenne's loss meant that Mauresmo would reach the No. 1 ranking position for the first time. In the bottom half of the draw, Elena Dementieva beat Mauresmo and Capriati—who was coming off a controversial win against Serena Williams in the quarterfinals with several contentious line calls going against Williams—to reach her second Grand Slam final. In another all-Russian final, Kuznetsova became the third player from the country to win her maiden Grand Slam in succession.

Mauresmo's reign at No. 1 turned out to be short-lived, with Davenport, who won the title in Stuttgart during the fall season, displacing her one-month later. Nevertheless, it turned out to be a successful stretch for Mauresmo, who claimed titles in Linz and Philadelphia. Alicia Molik won her biggest career title in Zurich and a smaller event in Luxembourg, while Myskina defended her title in Moscow. Svetlana Kuznetsova won the title in Bali and reached the final in Beijing, losing to Serena Williams. It was Sharapova who ended up winning the season-ending WTA Tour Championships, beating Williams in the final, after picking up smaller titles in Seoul and Tokyo, and reaching the final in Zurich. Nadia Petrova and Meghann Shaughnessy won the doubles event.

Schedule 
The table below shows the 2004 WTA Tour schedule.

Key

January

February

March

April

May

June

July

August

September

October

November

Statistics 
List of players and titles won, last name alphabetically:
  Lindsay Davenport – Tokyo Pan Pacific, Amelia Island, Stanford, Los Angeles, San Diego, Cincinnati and Filderstadt (7)
  Justine Henin-Hardenne – Sydney, Australian Open, Dubai, Indian Wells and Athens Olympics (5)
  Amélie Mauresmo – Berlin, Rome, Montreal, Linz and Philadelphia (5)
  Maria Sharapova – Birmingham, Wimbledon, Seoul, Tokyo and WTA Tour Championships (5)
  Svetlana Kuznetsova – Eastbourne, U.S. Open and Bali (3)
  Alicia Molik – Stockholm, Zurich and Luxembourg (3)
  Anastasia Myskina – Doha, French Open and Moscow (3)
  Kim Clijsters – Paris and Antwerp (2)
  Émilie Loit – Casablanca and Estoril (2)
  Nicole Vaidišová – Vancouver and Tashkent (2)
  Serena Williams – Miami and Beijing (2)
  Venus Williams – Charleston and Warsaw (2)
  Jelena Janković – Budapest (1)
  Iveta Benešová – Acapulco (1)
  Elena Bovina – New Haven (1)
  Eleni Daniilidou – Auckland (1)
  Elena Dementieva – Hasselt (1)
  Amy Frazier – Hobart (1)
  Li Na – Guangzhou (1)
  Elena Likhovtseva – Forest Hills (1)
  Anabel Medina Garrigues – Palermo (1)
  Flavia Pennetta – Sopot (1)
  Mary Pierce – 's-Hertogenbosch (1)
  Nicole Pratt – Hyderabad (1)
  Claudine Schaul – Strasbourg (1)
  Anna Smashnova-Pistolesi – Vienna (1)
  Paola Suárez – Canberra (1)
  Martina Suchá – Quebec City (1)
  Ai Sugiyama – Gold Coast (1)
  Fabiola Zuluaga – Bogotá (1)
  Vera Zvonareva – Memphis (1)

The following players won their first title:
  Nicole Pratt – Hyderabad
  Iveta Benešová – Acapulco
  Émilie Loit – Casablanca
  Jelena Janković – Budapest
  Claudine Schaul – Strasbourg
  Flavia Pennetta – Sopot
  Nicole Vaidišová – Vancouver
  Li Na – Guangzhou

Titles won by nation:
  – 15 (Memphis, Doha, French Open, Birmingham, Eastbourne, Wimbledon, New Haven, Forest Hills, U.S. Open, Bali, Hasselt, Seoul, Tokyo, Moscow and WTA Tour Championships)
  – 12 (Hobart, Tokyo Pan Pacific, Miami, Amelia Island, Charleston, Warsaw, Stanford, Los Angeles, San Diego, Cincinnati, Beijing and Filderstadt)
  – 8 (Casablanca, Estoril, Berlin, Rome, 's-Hertogenbosch, Montreal, Linz and Philadelphia)
  – 7 (Sydney, Australian Open, Paris, Antwerp, Dubai, Indian Wells and Athens Olympics)
  – 4 (Hyderabad, Stockholm, Zurich and Luxembourg)
  – 3 (Acapulco, Vancouver and Tashkent)
  – 1 (Canberra)
  – 1 (Guangzhou)
  – 1 (Bogotá)
  – 1 (Auckland)
  – 1 (Vienna)
  – 1 (Sopot)
  – 1 (Gold Coast)
  – 1 (Strasbourg)
  – 1 (Budapest)
  – 1 (Quebec City)
  – 1 (Palermo)

Rankings 
Below are the 2004 WTA year-end rankings:

Number 1 ranking

See also 
 2004 ATP Tour

References 

 
WTA Tour
WTA Tour seasons